The Nonionacea is a superfamily of protists within the foraminiferal order Rotaliida that unites the families Nonionidae, Spirotectintidae, and Almaenidae; characterized by tests commonly of perforate hyaline oblique calcite, usually appearing optically granular.

References

Alfred R. Loeblich Jr and HelenTappan,1988. Forminiferal Genera and their Classification. 

Foraminifera superfamilies
Rotaliida